Podrute is a village near Novi Marof in northern Croatia. It is connected by the D24 highway and R201 railway.

The 1992 European Community Monitor Mission helicopter downing occurred in the air space above Podrute.

References

Populated places in Varaždin County